Rowdy Rathore is a 2012 Indian Hindi-language action film directed by Prabhu Deva and produced by Sanjay Leela Bhansali and Ronnie Screwvala under the UTV Motion Pictures and Bhansali Productions banners. A remake of the 2006 Telugu film Vikramarkudu, based on an original story written by V. Vijayendra Prasad, it stars Akshay Kumar in double roles of a brave police officer and thief. The film also features Sonakshi Sinha, Gurdeep Kohli, Yashpal Sharma and Paresh Ganatra in supporting roles, while Nassar portrays the main antagonist. In the film, Vikram Rathore, a brave police officer, dies at the hands of corrupt politicians. But his team replaces him with Shiva, a thief who happens to be his look-alike, in an attempt to catch the culprits.

Filmed primarily in Mumbai and Hampi on a budget of 60 crore, Rowdy Rathore was released worldwide on 1 June 2012. Its music was composed by Sajid–Wajid. It opened to mixed to reviews from the critics and became a blockbuster at the domestic and worldwide box office. It has emerged one of the biggest grosser ever in Mumbai circuit and grossed  in seven weeks. The film grossed over  becoming one of the highest-grossing Indian films.

Plot
Shivam "Shiva" Bhardwaj is a small-time thief in Mumbai who falls in love with Parvati "Paro" Gupta from Patna. He tells her the truth about being a thief and resolves to give up crime because he loves Paro dearly. Before that, he decides to commit a large robbery along with his con-friend 2G, which would enable him to earn a lot of money so he can give up the crime life. He also "tricks" a woman on a railway station and flees with a trunk. This leads Shiva to Neha aka Chinki, a little girl who was in the trunk instead of the wealth he thought was there. Chinki thinks that he is her father. Puzzled, he is forced to keep Chinki with him, as a police officer Vishal Sharma keeps his eye on him.

Shiva fears Paro will catch him with Chinki, and he will lose her forever. He finds a photo of Chinki and her father, who looks exactly like Shiva, thus realizing why Chinki thinks Shiva is her father. Eventually, it is revealed that Chinki's father is Vikram Singh Rathore, a brave police officer who criminals fear. While chasing a goon to find his daughter, Vikram gets hit by an auto, and his brain endures severe trauma. The doctor tells him that the brain injury is serious enough to put his life in danger.

After a few days, Shiva gets fed up with Chinki and breaks the tape recorder she uses to listen to her late mother's voice. The next morning, he learns that her mother died. Feeling guilty, he fixes the recorder and becomes fond of Chinki, taking care of her. Unfortunately, Paro sees this and believes he has a daughter that he hid from her, and she leaves for Patna heartbroken. Soon, the goons who are after Vikram see Shiva. Thinking he is Vikram, they start chasing him. Shiva and Chinki flee for their lives and encounter the woman from the railway station, who tells Shiva to run. Shiva is soon surrounded by the goons; it is revealed that Vikram is watching the whole thing from the top of a building. Just as Shiva is about to get stabbed, Vikram jumps down, killing one of the goons.

Shiva and the goons are shocked to see the identical-looking Vikram. Vikram locks Shiva and Chinki in a cell for safety and starts fighting the goons. His brain injury gets worse, but he eventually kills every goon by himself.

At the hospital, Shiva realizes that the railway station woman is, in fact, a real police officer, Inspector Razia Khan. The officers tell Shiva that the man who looks like him is DIG Vikram Singh Rathore, a disciplined and respected police officer.

The officers narrate the whole incident to Shiva. Six months ago, Vikram traveled to a village called Devgarh as the new DIG. There, a goon called Baapji and his son Munna caused trouble, torturing and annexing money from the villagers. Vikram immediately arrested Munna by force for raping Vishal's wife, but he was released because of Baapji's political influence. Baapji arranged a party celebrating Munna's release. At the party, Munna humiliated the police officers and made them pull their pants down. Vikram, being the next target, moved back to the balcony, where Munna slipped off and died in the process. The next day, Vikram got attacked by Baapji's brother Titla, where he was stabbed in the back while the people were celebrating Munna's death, and shot in the head while trying to save a village child. He was then assumed to be dead. While the police officers were getting ready to bury him, he started breathing, having survived. Everybody promised not to disclose this to anyone. The officers then took Vikram to Mumbai for treatment.

After Shiva hears the whole story, the doctors say that Vikram doesn't have much time left. Vikram requests Shiva to take care of Chinki. Shiva promises and says that Chinki is now his daughter. Vikram dies holding Shiva's hand.

Shiva vows to complete Vikram's unfinished work. He takes on Vikram's identity and goes to Devgarh with Chinki to take revenge. He sets Baapji's liquor factory on fire and distributes the grains and money back to the villagers. Paro finds out the truth, reconciles with him, and vows that she will also take care of Chinki. He also encouraged police officers to beat Baapji and crews with sticks. Following a heavy climax, Shiva eventually kills Baapji and Titla, and rescues Paro and Chinki after they are kidnapped by Baapji and Titla. The story with Devgarh now falling back into safe hands and Shiva, Paro and 2G leaving on train with Chinki, presumably back to Mumbai.

Cast

Special appearances

Production

Casting 
Akshay Kumar learnt a special combat karate technique for his character role in the film. Kumar reported that he had accepted the role in Rowdy Rathore since his son loves to watch him in action roles. Sanjay Leela Bhansali teamed up with designer Shabinaa Khan to co-produce Rowdy Rathore, which is his first film with Akshay Kumar. It is also Bhansali's second film as a producer and his first in the action genre. Maryam Zakaria was selected to perform an item number.

Prabhu Deva, Kareena Kapoor, and Vijay made a friendly appearance in the video for "Chinta Ta" song.

Filming 
The filming started on 10 August 2011. During the shooting for a climax scene, Akshay hurt his shoulder. The police denied permission for the shooting of Rowdy Rathore at the World Heritage Site Hampi, following protests from local activists and artists. The film unit consisting of director Prabhu Deva, actors Akshay Kumar, Sonakshi Sinha and 50 other dancers left the site on Tuesday, authorities issued directions to the crew to stop shooting with immediate effect following violations of ASI conservation rules and for tranquillity. Local people and artists opposed the shooting of a song sequence, featuring Akshay and Sonakshi, along with many dancers, scheduled to be shot at several heritage sites in Karnataka, including the Vijaya Vittala temple, Lotus Mahal, Maha Navami Dibba and other historic places in the 15th century capital of the Vijayanagara Empire. The movie had the 50 crore insurance for Akshay Kumar.

Marketing

The trailer of Rowdy Rathore was launched in an open stadium in Worli on 2 April 2012 and received over 2,295,756 views in under one month on YouTube.

UTV tied up with radio channel Red FM for organizing a contest titled "Rowdy Hunt" to look for social do-gooders and others who work towards social betterment – winners of the contest will accompany star Akshay Kumar to promote the film during his tours. The hunt has taken place in Ahmedabad, Hyderabad, Jaipur, Lucknow, Mumbai and New Delhi, where callers were invited to share their grievances and tackle the culprit on a public platform in true "Rowdy" style. The RJ/host will then select five rowdies in each city based on a "Rowdy Meter" who will then comprise Akshay Kumar's Rowdy Gang in a particular city.

The cast and crew went to Dubai as part of the promotional tour. Sonakshi Sinha promoted the film on Big FM. On 26 May 2012, she promoted the film on Dance India Dance Lil' Masters on Zee Tv, and the Zee Network are giving out free cinema tickets to people who are correct in the Safari Cinema. Wardrobe company Dollar Industries has tied up with the producers to promote their products with the film.

Music

The soundtrack is by Sajid–Wajid and was released on 27 April 2012. The line Chinta Ta Ta Ta and part of its music has been borrowed from the original song of its Telugu version, which was confirmed by Wajid. Kumar Sanu has sung a song for this film, making his comeback after four years. The song "Aa Re Pritam Pyaare" used the hook tune from the Tamil song "Vaadi Vaadi Naattu Katta" from Alli Thandha Vaanam

Release
The film released worldwide on 1 June 2012. Rowdy Rathore was released in 2,300 screens in India and around 400 screens overseas.

Critical reception

Rowdy Rathore received mixed reviews from critics. Taran Adarsh of Bollywood Hungama gave the film 4 stars, saying, "If you savor typical masaledaar fares, this one should be on your have-to-watch listing for certain. Dhamaal entertainer!"  DNA India gave 3 stars out of 5 and said, "Rowdy is Akshay's return to action. And how! The actor takes charge of the film from the first scene and holds it tight all through. To put it simply, the film is to Akshay what Wanted was for Salman!" Srijana Mitra Das for The Times of India gave the film 3 stars of 5, and said, "Fans will love Akshay's mooch-twirling masala-act but be ready for hardcore action too — some pretty gruesome."

Mrigank Dhaniwala for Koimoi.com gave it 3 stars out of 5, and gave the verdict that the film entertains in parts. "Watch it for Akshay Kumar's performance and the comedy." Shomini Sen from Zee News also gave 3 stars out of 5 and said, "The premise of the film may be good, but the treatment is that of a typical south Indian pot boiler." Based on 21 reviews, review aggregate site desimartini.com gave the verdict, "Although the movie doesn't do complete justice to the original Telugu blockbuster, it does have some funny dialogues and action sequences that will make you want to whistle! Rowdy Rathore is a one time watch." The site's average audience rating is 3/5.

Saibal Chatterjee of NDTV gave the film 2 stars out of 5, saying, "Rowdy Rathore plays out pretty much like a comic-book fantasy rendered in the form of a live-action film. Go for it if you must, but don't expect the earth from it." Blessy Chettiar of DNA India gave the film 2 stars out of 5, concluding, "Akshay's me-too is fun while it lasts. Watch it for him, lest he feels bad for jumping on the South remake bandwagon too late to get any attention." Raja Sen of Rediff.com too gave the film 2 stars out of 5, and commented, "It can hardly be called a film, but ah well. Watch it if only to remind yourself of old Khiladi flicks...." Oneindia.in criticised the film's illogical plot, however concluded saying, "Overall, Rowdy Rathore is a total paisa wasool film, hence it's a must watch."

Trisha Gupta of Firstpost reviewed "Rowdy Rathore is a mess of maal, masala and moustache while it has neither the wit nor the charm needed to craft a real send-up". Mayank Shekhar, on his website theW14.com, says "While you can't tell one Akshay Kumar from the other in this film, you obviously can't tell this film from any other action hit from recent or distant past either. That's what a dead formula film is supposed to be. Going by box-office figures, the producers, Sanjay Leela Bhansali and UTV, are certain this is what the audiences currently desire. They probably do. Is this what they deserve? I'm not sure. Anupama Chopra of Hindustan Times gave the film 1 out of 5 stars and said, "The film is one more in the line of movies — many of which are remakes from the south — that value masala above all else. But Dabangg and even Wanted, the latter of which was also directed by Prabhu Deva, were far more cohesive and compelling. Rowdy Rathore is pure noise. Only the brave should venture in." Rajeev Masand of CNN-IBN gave 1 stars out of 5, commenting "At 2 hours and 20 minutes, Rowdy Rathore is excruciatingly long. The one-liners have little impact and make no sense, and the action has a been-there-seen-that feel to it. A few jokes work because Akshay Kumar does goofy well, but this film doesn't have half the energy of Prabhudeva's last directorial outing in Hindi, the Salman Khan starrer Wanted."

Box office
Rowdy Rathore had been the most appreciated film since Dabangg released in 2010. It had seen the best word of mouth since Dabangg which is reflected in trending of its first three-week run. Rowdy Rathore has emerged one of the biggest grosser ever in Mumbai circuit and grossed  in seven weeks.

India
The film took a bumper opening at single screens at an occupancy of around 95%–100%. It collected around  nett domestic in the opening day. Rowdy Rathore had collected around  nett plus in its first week and this makes it the second highest collections ever for a regular Friday-Thursday week behind Dabangg, which collected  nett. The collections of Rowdy Rathore were around  nett on its 8th day, which was better than the new release Shanghai on its first week. The film collected a huge  nett in its second week taking the two-week business to  nett. It was steady on its third week as it collected around  nett on its third Friday despite being new release, Ferrari Ki Sawaari. The film eventually made  in India.

Other territories
Rowdy Rathore had collected around  overseas in ten days. Collections had been considered average" in most circuits while UAE was the best.

Home media

The satellite rights of the Hindi version were syndicated to Sony Entertainment Television. Later on, the film was also dubbed in regional languages- Tamil, Telugu and Malayalam. The rights of the Tamil Version were secured by Star Vijay. The rights of the Telugu version were purchased by Star Maa. The rights of the Malayalam version were acquired by Asianet. All the three dubbed versions were given a U/A rating.

For theatrical release, the film was given a U/A certificate, but later on, the film was recertified U by the censor board for video and release on Doordarshan.

See also
 List of highest-grossing Bollywood films

References

External links

 
 
 
 

2012 action films
2010s police films
2012 films
Films directed by Prabhu Deva
Films set in Bangalore
Indian action films
Indian police films
Films about lookalikes
Hindi remakes of Telugu films
2012 masala films
UTV Motion Pictures films
Fictional portrayals of the Maharashtra Police
Hindi-language action films
Films shot in Mumbai
2010s Hindi-language films